Jacqueline G. Suthren Hirst or Jackie Hirst is a senior lecturer in comparative religion and South Asian studies at Manchester University.

She has an MA and PhD from Cambridge University and is a qualified teacher, and taught religious education in a school for five years. She was a senior lecturer at Homerton College, training teachers to teach religious education, before moving to Manchester in 1994.

She has been a guest on BBC Radio 4's In Our Time, in an episode first broadcast on 6 October 2016 on the topic of Lakshmi.

Selected publications

Works published for children

References

External links 

 Lakshmi, BBC Radio 4 In Our Time, link. Jacqueline Suthren-Hirst on the panel with Jessica Frazier and Chakravarthi Ram-Prasad.
 Vimeo "Religious Traditions in Modern South Asia - Dr Jacqueline Suthren Hirst and Dr John Zavos"

Year of birth missing (living people)
Living people
Academics of the University of Manchester
British women academics 
Alumni of the University of Cambridge
Religious studies scholars
Academics of the University of Cambridge